International crime may refer to:

International criminal law, a body of law that defines four main categories of international crimes
Genocide
 Crimes against humanity
 War crimes
 Crime of aggression
Transnational crime, a crime with actual or potential effect across national borders
International Crime (1938 film), a film directed by Charles Lamont